Dwaine Harvey Hoberg (August 17, 1925 – August 6, 1984) was an American football coach and state legislator in Minnesota.  He served as the head football coach at Minnesota State University Moorhead from 1960 to 1969, compiling a record of 41–45–2.

Hoberg began his political career in 1963 with election to the Moorhead City Council. He served on the council two terms as alderman for the 4th district, and was elected mayor of the city in 1971. After three terms as mayor, Hoberg was defeated in re-election, but subsequently won a seat in the Minnesota Legislature, where he served until his retirement in 1984. Hoberg was a promoter in wrestling for the American Wrestling Association from 1960 until his death in 1984.

Head coaching record

References

External links
 

1925 births
1984 deaths
Players of American football from Minnesota
Coaches of American football from Minnesota
Minnesota Golden Gophers football players
Minnesota State–Moorhead Dragons football coaches
Minnesota city council members
Mayors of places in Minnesota
Republican Party members of the Minnesota House of Representatives
People from Worthington, Minnesota
20th-century American politicians